Miljan Zekić (born 12 July 1988) is a Serbian tennis player.

Career
Zekić made his ATP main draw debut in doubles with compatriot David Savić as a wildcard pair at the 2011 Serbia Open, losing in the first round to top-seeded pair Zimonjić/Granollers. On 11 July 2016, Zekic reached his best singles ranking of world number 188, while on 8 July 2013, he peaked at world number 269 in the doubles rankings. In July 2016 he won his first trophy on the ATP Challenger Tour winning Internazionali di Tennis dell'Umbria in Todi.

Zekić made his ATP main draw debut in singles as a qualifier at 2017 Croatia Open Umag, losing to Radu Albot in the first round. In two weeks' time, he played in another ATP tournament, 2017 Generali Open Kitzbühel, defeating top seed Alessandro Giannessi and eighth seed Stefanos Tsitsipas in the qualifying rounds, and earned his first ATP main draw victory by defeating world No. 66 Andrey Kuznetsov, before losing to second seed and world No. 25 Fabio Fognini in the second round.

Zekić was a fifth (reserve) player on a Serbian Davis Cup team in the semifinal against France in the 2017 Davis Cup and didn't play in any match. The following year he made his Davis Cup debut, partnered with another debutant, Nikola Milojević, in a doubles match against USA losing 7–6(3), 2–6, 5–7, 4–6 in the first round.

Performance timeline

Singles

ATP Challenger and ITF Futures finals

Singles: 44 (26–18)

Doubles: 42 (21–21)

References

External links

1988 births
Living people
Serbian male tennis players
Tennis players from Belgrade